The 2013–14 season will be Szombathelyi Haladás's 58th competitive season, 6th consecutive season in the OTP Bank Liga and 94th year in existence as a football club.

First team squad

Transfers

Summer

In:

Out:

Winter

In:

Out:

List of Hungarian football transfers summer 2013
List of Hungarian football transfers winter 2013–14

Statistics

Appearances and goals
Last updated on 1 June 2014.

|-
|colspan="14"|Youth players:

|-
|colspan="14"|Out to loan:

|-
|colspan="14"|Players no longer at the club:

|}

Top scorers
Includes all competitive matches. The list is sorted by shirt number when total goals are equal.

Last updated on 1 June 2014

Disciplinary record
Includes all competitive matches. Players with 1 card or more included only.

Last updated on 1 June 2014

Overall

Last updated: 1 June 2014Source:

Nemzeti Bajnokság I

Matches

Classification

Results summary

Results by round

Hungarian Cup

League Cup

Group stage

Classification

Knockout phase

Pre Season (Summer)

Pre Season (Winter)

Spring

References

External links
 Eufo
 Official Website
 UEFA
 fixtures and results

Szombathelyi Haladás seasons
Hungarian football clubs 2013–14 season